This page gathers the results of elections in Veneto.

Veneto has always been characterised by the big role played by the Catholic Church and centrist politics, but was also an early stronghold of the Radical Party and the Italian Socialist Party. In 1919, in the first election with male universal suffrage, the Catholic-inspired Italian People's Party won 42.6% of the vote and the Italian Socialist Party 36.2%.

After World War II, Veneto was a stronghold of Christian Democracy, which was by far the largest party, successively won all the elections from 1946 to 1992 and continuously held the helm of the Regional Government from its establishment in 1970 to 1993. In 1994 the party was disbanded and its main successor, the new Italian People's Party, was much weaker.

In the 1980s Veneto saw the rise of Venetian nationalism and Liga Veneta, a regionalist party which was a founding member of Lega Nord in 1991. Liga Veneta almost replaced Christian Democracy in its heartlands, but was not initially able to gain regional power. In fact, since 1995, Christian Democracy's hegemony was replaced by that of the centre-right Pole/House of Freedoms coalition and especially Forza Italia, whose regional leader Giancarlo Galan was President of Veneto for 15 years.

After a decline in term of votes and a resurgence, in 2010 Liga Veneta gained control of the Regional Government with Luca Zaia as President and the support of The People of Freedom, a broad centre-right party resulted from the merger of Forza Italia and National Alliance. Liga Veneta and Zaia were confirmed in 2015, with a more cohesive majority.

On 22 October 2017 an autonomy referendum took place in Veneto: 57.2% of Venetians participated and 98.1% voted "yes".

Electoral history
The provincial breakdown of selected election results is shown in the tables below. Only parties above 5% are included.

1946 general election
The 1946 general election was the first after the return of democracy. Christian Democracy (DC) was by far the largest party (49.5%) and was especially strong in the provinces of Vicenza (61.1%), Padua (55.7%) and Treviso (53.5%). The Italian Socialist Party (PSI) came second (26.7%) and was stronger in the provinces of Rovigo (35.7%), Verona (33.3%) and Belluno (28.7%). The Italian Communist Party (PCI) was a distant third (13.6%), but came second in Rovigo (28.5%), where the parties of the left gained a large majority (56.5%). Rovigo, the southernmost province, was influenced by nearby "red" Emilia-Romagna.

Source: Regional Council of Veneto

1948 general election
The 1948 general election was a triumph for DC, which won a thumping 60.5% throughout Veneto. The party did better in its traditional strongholds, Vicenza (71.8%), Padua (65.4%) and Treviso (64.9%). The PSI and the PCI, united in the Popular Democratic Front (FDP), won a mere 23.9% of the vote. Apart from Rovigo, where the FDP gained 48.2%, many Socialist votes went to DC and the Italian Democratic Socialist Party (PSDI), an outfit formed by those Socialists who opposed the alliance with the Communists. The PSDI garnered 10.1% of the vote at the regional level and was stronger in Belluno (15.9%), Treviso (12.6%) and Verona (10.1%).

Source: Regional Council of Veneto

1953 general election
In the 1953 general election DC lost some ground, however gaining a convincing 53.4% of the vote (62.2% in Vicenza, 59.9% in Treviso and 59.6% in Padua). The PSI and the PCI ran separate lists, gaining 14.6 and 14.2% of the vote. Veneto was thus one of the few regions of Italy where the Socialists were stronger than the PCI, even without counting the PSDI (5.6%). The PSI got its best results in the provinces of Venice (21.6%), Rovigo (19.8%) and Verona (18.2%), but not in the traditional Socialist stronghold of Belluno, where it was passed by the PSDI (12.3 against 11.0%). The PCI was stronger in Rovigo (28.2%) and Venice (19.7%).

Source: Regional Council of Veneto

1970 regional election
Election results were quite stable for four decades. In the 1970 regional election, the first after the establishment of Veneto as a Region, DC was by far the largest party with 51.8%. As usual, its strongholds included the provinces of Vicenza (64.2%), Padua (56.3%) and Treviso (56.0%). Up to that time the PCI had passed the PSI as second largest party: in 1970 the former garnered 16.8%, the second 10.4% and the PSDI 7.6%. Rovigo was the most left-wing province (the sum of PCI and PSI was 42.3%), followed by Venice (39.2%), and Belluno the most Socialist one (the sum of PSDI and PSI was 27.9%), followed by Treviso (20.6%).

Source: Regional Council of Veneto

1990 regional election
Since 1980 DC experienced a steady decline in term of votes, largely due to the rise of Liga Veneta (LV) and other Venetist parties. In the 1990 regional election DC was still the largest party of Veneto (42.4%), but suffered the competition of the LV in its heartlands. Venetist parties were fairly strong in Vicenza (11.4%) and Verona (10.8%), while the PSI and the PCI retained their strongholds (Belluno with 23.8% and Rovigo with 29.0%, respectively). Both Rovigo and Venice had PCI–PSI majorities.

* = Including UPVSource: Regional Council of Veneto.

1992 general election
The 1992 general election was a realigning one in Italy, due to the rise of Lega Nord, a federation of northern regionalist parties of which the LV was a founding member. The realignment was especially visible in Veneto where DC, though still being the largest party, lost almost a third of its voters between 1990 and 1992, stopping at 31.5%. The LV gained ground in the Pedemontana, that is to say the provinces at the feet of the mountains, most of which had long been DC's heartlands: 21.5% in Treviso, 20.6% in Verona and 19.5% in Vicenza. In Belluno the LV became the largest party with 27.8%, by reducing the vote of DC and halving that of the PSI. The total score of Venetist parties was 31.8% in Vicenza, 29.3% in Treviso, 27.2% in Verona and 22.9% in Padua. The PDS got just 9.9% regionally, fairly less than the PCI in 1990.

Ven. = Other Venetists, including LAV, UPV and MVRA.Source: Regional Council of Veneto

1994 general election
The 1994 general election marked a full-scale realignment in Venetian electoral politics. In 1993–1994 the Tangentopoli scandals led to the disappearance of the main government parties, including DC and the PSI, while the PCI was transformed into the Democratic Party of the Left (PDS). The DC successor, the Italian People's Party (PPI), was not able to retain the votes of its predecessor, which were largely absorbed by the LV and Forza Italia, the new party launched by entrepreneur Silvio Berlusconi.

In a highly fragmented party system, FI came first with 23.6%, the LV second with 21.6% and the PPI (along with Patto Segni, a small centrist ally) third with 20.2%. Curiously enough FI was stronger in a centre-left province, Venice (26.7%), while the LV did better in Belluno (32.4%) and in formerly DC's heartlands, Treviso (28.5%) and Vicenza (28.1%). In Padua the PPI and Patto Segni got 23.7% together, slightly behind FI (24.1%). The PCI slightly improved its performance to 12.1%. Under the new voting system, the FI–LV coalition won 37 seats out of 50 for the Chamber (36 out of 37 in single-seat districts).

* = Including Patto Segni.Source: Regional Council of Veneto

1996 general election
The 1996 general election saw a huge success of the LV, which was by far the largest party with 29.2%. As usual, the party was especially strong in the mountains and the Pedemontana: Belluno (41.4%), Treviso (41.4%), Vicenza (36.1%) and Verona (25.7%). FI was a distant second with 17.1%, the PDS third with 11.8%, National Alliance (AN) fourth with 11.7% and the PPI fifth with 8.1%. The PDS was the largest party in Rovigo (21.3%), while AN proved particularly strong in Verona (14.7%), Padua (13.7%) and Rovigo (13.7%). Padua was the province where the PPI scored better (9.6%).

Source: Regional Council of Veneto

2000 regional election
The 2000 regional election was the heyday for FI, which replaced the LV as Veneto's largest party with 30.4% and did particularly well in Vicenza (31.8%), Belluno (31.7%) and Verona (31.4%). The LV got a poor 12.0%, due to some damaging splits and a big swing of Venetist votes to FI. A centrist federation, including the PPI, gained 13.6%, the Democrats of the Left (DS) 12.3%, AN 9.8% and the Christian democrats (CDU and CCD) 6.8%.

* = Including CCD.Source: Regional Council of Veneto

2005 regional election
The 2005 regional election saw a comeback of Venetist parties: the LV won 14.7% of the vote, while brand new North-East Project got 5.5%. Both were especially strong in Treviso, which proved again to be a Venetist stronghold: 23.1 and 15.6%, respectively. FI was reduced to 22.7% and was no longer Veneto's largest party, as it was passed by The Olive Tree (including the DS and the successor of the PPI, DL) and its allies, which got 29.0% regionally. AN gained 8.1% and the Union of Christian and Centre Democrats (UDC), resulted from the merger of CDU and CCD, 6.4%. Padua was again the province were post-DC parties did better: FI 25.3% and UDC 9.2%.

* = Including For Veneto with Carraro.Source: Regional Council of Veneto

2010 regional election
The 2010 regional election concluded a realignment started with the 2008 general election, under which the LV returned to be Veneto's largest party. With 35.2% of the votes it was also the first party in two decades to gain more than 30%. The party got a thumping 48.5% in Treviso, 38.1% in Vicenza, 36.1% in Verona, 32.8% in Belluno and 31.4% in Padua. In these five provinces the LV was by far the largest party. The People of Freedom (PdL), result of the merger of FI with AN, came second with 24.7% and the Democratic Party (PD), result of the merger of the DS with DL, third with 20.3%.

Source: Regional Council of Veneto

2013 general election
The 2013 general election saw the rise of the Five Star Movement (M5S), a protest party which attracted disillusioned voters from all the major parties, in Veneto especially from the LV. In a very fragmented political landscape. M5S won 26.3% in the region, ahead of the PD (21.3%), the PdL (18.7%), the LV (10.5%) and Civic Choice (SC, 10.1%). The future will tell whether the 2013 election has constituted a realigning election or just a deviating one.

Source: Regional Council of Veneto

2015 regional election
The 2015 regional election was a triumph for the LV, which obtained an unprecedented 40.9% of the vote (combined result of official party list and President Luca Zaia's personal list, 17.8% and 23.1%, respectively). The LV, which was the first party in 25 years to get more than 40% of the vote, was stronger in Treviso, where it gained a landslide 53.8% of the vote. The PD won 20.5% (combined result of official party list and Alessandra Moretti's personal list, 16.7% and 3.8%, respectively), the Tosi List for Veneto, a splinter group from the LV, 7.1% (combined results of two lists named after Flavio Tosi, 5.7% and 1.4%, respectively), Venetist parties, notably including Independence We Veneto (2.7%) and Venetian Independence (2.5%), 6.3%, and Forza Italia, the latest reincarnation of FI/PdL, a mere 6.0%.

Ven. = Other Venetists, including INV, IV, UNE, PVA and VSC.Source: Regional Council of Veneto

2020 regional election
The 2020 regional election was a triumph for the LV, which obtained an unprecedented 61.5% of the vote (combined result of official party list and President Luca Zaia's personal list, 16.9% and 44.6%, respectively). The LV, which was the most voted party in the history of Veneto, was stronger in Treviso, where it gained a landslide 68.6% of the vote. The PD won 11.9%, the Brothers of Italy, reincarnation of AN, 9.6%, FI 3.6% and the M5S 2.7%.

Ven. = Other Venetists, including LVA, PdV, VpA and SV.Source: Regional Council of Veneto

Regional elections
The President of Veneto is elected directly by the people every five years. Also the Regional Council is elected every five years, but, if the President suffers a vote of no confidence, resigns or dies, the Council is dissolved and fresh elections are called. The Council is composed of 51 members, of which 49 are elected in provincial constituencies with proportional representation, while the remaining two are the elected President and the candidate for President who comes second.

Latest regional election

The latest regional election took place on 20–21 September 2020.

Luca Zaia of Liga Veneta–Lega was re-elected President by a landslide 76.8% of the vote, while his main rival Arturo Lorenzoni stopped at 15.7%. Liga Veneta, which ran an official party list and a list named after Zaia, was confirmed the largest in the region with a combined 61.5% of the vote. The Democratic Party came second with 11.9% and the Brothers of Italy third with 9.6%. The total score of Venetist parties was 65.6%, the highest ever.

List of previous regional elections
1970 Venetian regional election
1975 Venetian regional election
1980 Venetian regional election
1985 Venetian regional election
1990 Venetian regional election
1995 Venetian regional election
2000 Venetian regional election
2005 Venetian regional election
2010 Venetian regional election
2015 Venetian regional election

Italian general elections in Veneto

Latest general election

The centre-right coalition (56.3%), this time dominated by the Brothers of Italy, obtained a far larger victory than four years before over the centre-left coalition (23.0%), Action – Italia Viva (8.4%) and the Five Star Movement (5.8%). One third of deputies and senators were elected in single-seat constituencies and, as in 2018, the centre-right won all such constituencies. Among parties, the Brothers of Italy came largely first with 32.7% of the vote, followed by the Democratic Party (16.3%) and Lega (14.5%). The biggest turnaround happened within the centre-right, as Lega lost more than half of the votes obtained in 2018 (–17.7pp) and the Brothers of Italy jumped from 4.2% to virtually eight times that share (+28.5pp).

List of previous general elections
1946 Italian general election in Veneto
1948 Italian general election in Veneto
1953 Italian general election in Veneto
1958 Italian general election in Veneto
1963 Italian general election in Veneto
1968 Italian general election in Veneto
1972 Italian general election in Veneto
1976 Italian general election in Veneto
1979 Italian general election in Veneto
1983 Italian general election in Veneto
1987 Italian general election in Veneto
1992 Italian general election in Veneto
1994 Italian general election in Veneto
1996 Italian general election in Veneto
2001 Italian general election in Veneto
2006 Italian general election in Veneto
2008 Italian general election in Veneto
2013 Italian general election in Veneto
2018 Italian general election in Veneto

European Parliament elections in Veneto

Latest European Parliament election

The European Parliament election of 2019 took place in Italy on 26 May 2019. Lega Nord came first with 49.9% of the vote (country-level result 34.3%) and more than 20pp than the Democratic Party, which came second with 18.9% of the vote. The Five Star Movement came third with 8.9%, ahead of Brothers of Italy (6.8%), Forza Italia (6.1%), Green Europe (2.7%), More Europe (2.7%) and The Left (1.1%).

List of previous European Parliament elections
1979 European Parliament election in Veneto
1984 European Parliament election in Veneto
1989 European Parliament election in Veneto
1994 European Parliament election in Veneto
1999 European Parliament election in Veneto
2004 European Parliament election in Veneto
2009 European Parliament election in Veneto
2014 European Parliament election in Veneto

Provincial elections in Veneto

Municipal elections in Veneto

References

 
Politics of Veneto